Krishan Nagar is part of the Islampura neighbourhood of Lahore, Punjab, Pakistan.

During British Raj, in 1930s came a change in the development of middle class localities in Lahore and areas like Krishan Nagar and Sant Nagar were established. They were planned, geometrical in layout and had parks, sewage and drinking water facilities. In the houses in these areas, roofs of the rooms were high like British bungalows. These housing areas were an improved version of the old architecture of Lahore.

After the independence of Pakistan in 1947, the Hindu residents migrated to India. The area became mainly a residential quarter, heavily populated with Muslims. In 1992, after repeated protests from Muslims groups, Krishan Nagar and Sant Nagar were merged and renamed Islampura or 'Islam Town' to accurately reflect its demographic composition. However, it is still largely referred to by its former name, as is the case with many other localities of Lahore such as Dharampura (renamed Mustafa-abad), Bhalla stop (renamed Zaibunnisa stop).

References

History of Pakistan
Data Gunj Bakhsh Zone
Jewellery districts